Carolyn Joy Lawrence-Dill (born May 18, 1974) is an American plant biologist and academic administrator. She develops computational systems and tools to help plant science researchers use plant genetics and genomics data for basic biology applications that advance plant breeding.

Early life and education 
Carolyn Joy Lawrence-Dill, née Cogburn, was born in El Paso, Texas. She grew up in Throckmorton, then moved to Cleburne in 1989. She graduated in 1992 from Cleburne High School. 
Lawrence-Dill earned a B.A. degree in biology from Hendrix College in 1996. She received her M.S. degree in biology in 1997 from Texas Tech University where she worked on cotton physiology, and her Ph.D. degree in botany in 2003 from the University of Georgia. Her doctoral dissertation focused on integrating traditional and computational methods for inferring gene function in plants.

Career 
Following her formal education, Lawrence-Dill served for two years as a postdoctoral researcher under the direction of Volker Brendel at Iowa State University.

In the summer of 2005, Lawrence-Dill began work as a research geneticist for the USDA-ARS. She served as the director of MaizeGDB, the maize model organism database through December 2013. In 2014 she joined the faculty of Iowa State University as an associate professor in the Departments of Genetics, Development and Cell Biology and Agronomy. In 2019 she was promoted to the rank of professor. In 2021, she was named Associate Dean for Research and Discovery for the Iowa State University College of Agriculture and Life Sciences and Associate Director of the Iowa Agriculture and Home Economics Experiment Station.

Research 
Lawrence-Dill's research focuses on mapping genomes and gene elements., predicting protein function, inventing new ways to link genes to phenotypic descriptions and images, developing ways to compute on phenotypic descriptions, organizing broad datasets for community access and use, and developing computational tools that enable others to do all of these sorts of analyses directly. Although research and development projects are across the plant kingdom generally, much of her work focuses on maize.

Genomics 

Lawrence-Dill has advanced plant scientists' ability to access plant genomics resources by sequencing and assembling genomes, annotating structural elements including genes, regulatory elements and CRISPR sites to genomes, and creating tools that enable researchers to analyze gene expression data.

Phenomics 
Lawrence-Dill has advanced plant scientists' ability to compute on phenotype directly via connecting image-based phenotypes to genomics data, crowdsourcing for image-based machine learning, managing information for field and controlled environment high-throughput phenotyping, and computing on phenotypic descriptions.

Leadership and policy

Data sharing 
Much of the work Lawrence-Dill has published seeks to advance data sharing to enable researchers to make use of others' findings, as some scientists harbor concerns about data sharing that those who generate materials and data will not derive prominence from downstream use and benefits derived from their own data. However, generally limiting access to data prevents researchers from being able to test whether research results are reproducible. With respect to genomics data and materials, limiting access to digital sequence information (DSI) relevant to specific germplasm can keep researchers from being able to identify biological materials for novel research applications.

Climate and genetic engineering 
Lawrence-Dill regularly addresses timely topics like climate change and genetic engineering, advising colleagues to engage in discussions on these topics with colleagues in other disciplines, with policymakers, and with the general public. Her guidance focuses on finding shared values, articulating social, environmental, and economic opportunities, and appealing to a better future rather than negative consequences.

In 2016, Lawrence-Dill and sociologist Shawn Dorius began work to better understand where negative public opinions on GMOs and climate change originate. While investigating how GMOs were portrayed in US news coverage, information on Russian interference in the 2016 United States elections emerged, with English language Russian state news from RT and Sputnik being ordered to register as foreign agents. This led the team to look into news reported by RT and Sputnik, where they found their portrayal of GMO topics to be very different from that in US media. Russian state news about GMOs was almost entirely negative, with seemingly intentional mis-associations linking GMOs with controversial, unrelated, and distasteful topics (e.g., topics on abortions of Zika-infected fetuses and the Trans-Pacific Partnership). The team hypothesized that this sort of activity could aim not only to stir up controversy in the US, but that to serve economic interests in Russia given that Russia’s number two industry is agriculture.

While their findings were under peer review, the Des Moines Register released a front-page article describing their findings (February 25, 2018). The researchers released a preprint of the article via the SocArXiv within a day to ensure that detailed materials, methods, and interpretations of the data were fully available. A media frenzy followed with coverage in more than 80 newspapers, online websites, and radio broadcasts, with audio coverage through National Public Radio’s Marketplace (February 28, 2018) and Iowa Public Radio’s River to River (March 2, 2018). There was even a political cartoon released by Greg Kearney, and Bill Gates defended GMOs via a Reddit Ask Me Anything discussion in the midst of the coverage. The peer-reviewed publication was accepted March 11, 2018. Subsequent to media coverage of the GMO-Russia connections, reports of other seemingly unrelated hot topics showed signs of Russian influence with apparent intention to cause discord, with demonstrations of influence campaigns emerging on wide-ranging topics from energy to human rights to international trade.

Scientific community building 
Lawrence-Dill has brought together researchers across many communities to coordinate their work. This includes building consensus for standards and nomenclature, founding community organizations, and encouraging others through mentorship and training opportunities.

Awards 
 2020 	YWCA Women of Achievement (Ames, Iowa) award for eliminating racism and empowering women
 2013	Gamma Sigma Delta Induction
 2009	USDA-ARS Midwest Area Equal Opportunity Award for plant germplasm and genomics outreach to American Indians

Elected service 
 2018 	International Plant Phenotyping Network Board (3-year term; co-chair)
 2018 	North American Plant Phenotyping Network Executive Board (2-year term; 2019 chair; founded the 501(c)3)
 2016 	DivSeek International Network Steering Committee, later Board of Directors (member; 4-year term)
 2010 	Maize Genetics Executive Committee (5-year term; 2015 chair)

References

External links

Websites 
 Research Lab Website
 
 MaizeGDB

Podcasts 
 Plantae: Why is the field of phenomics important? (February 2018)
 The Taproot: Normalizing Nomenclature and The Idealism of Youth (July 2017)

Seminars 
 ISMB 2020 Function Special Interest Group: Function COSI Keynote: Saving Time at the Bench and in the Field: Predicting Gene Function and Phenotype in Crops  (13 July 2020)
 PHENOME 2018: The Future of Phenomics Enabled Biology: Key Takeaways from PHENOME 2018 cohosted with ISU Assistant Professor of Agricultural and Biological Engineering Joshua Peschel (March 2018)
 Plant Phenomics Phridays: Computing on Phenotype Descriptions for Novel Candidate Gene Prediction for the Plant Phenomics Phridays webinar series (July 2017)

Scientists from Texas
Iowa State University faculty
1974 births
Living people
Academic administration
21st-century American botanists
21st-century American women scientists
People from El Paso, Texas
American women botanists
Hendrix College alumni
Texas Tech University alumni
University of Georgia alumni
American women academics